Surveillance is the monitoring of people's actions.

Surveillance may also refer to:

Film and literature
 Surveillance (1997 film), a 1997 Chinese film
 Surveillance (2006 film), a 2006 film directed by Fritz Kiersch
 Surveillance (2008 film), a 2008 American thriller film directed by Jennifer Lynch
 Surveillance (novel), a 2006 novel by Jonathan Raban

Music
 Surveillance (Triumph album), 1987
 Surveillance (FM album), 1979
 "Surveillance" (song), the debut single of Wynter Gordon
 "Surveillance", a song by Interpol from Marauder
 Surveillance, an electronic music act from Seattle, a side project of Assemblage 23

See also
 Computer surveillance, performing surveillance of computer activity
 Disease surveillance, an epidemiological practice by which the spread of disease is monitored
 Surveillance abuse, the use of surveillance methods to monitor an individual or group in a way that violates the social norms or laws of a society